Cotana serranotata is a moth of the family Eupterotidae. It is found in Australia, where it has been recorded from Queensland.

The larvae feed on the foliage of Melaleuca species.

References

Moths described in 1894
Eupterotinae